Phyllonorycter tenebriosa is a moth of the family Gracillariidae. It is known from the island of Honshū in Japan.

The wingspan is 6-6.5 mm.

The larvae feed on Corylus heterophylla. They probably mine the leaves of their host plant.

References

tenebriosa
Moths of Japan
Moths described in 1967